Skin discoloration can be a side effect of certain medical therapies, for instance minocycline treatment and radiotherapy.

See also
 Argyria

References

Symptoms